The Papua New Guinean passport is issued to citizens of Papua New Guinea for international travel.

The passport is issued by the Passport Branch of the Papua New Guinea Immigration & Citizenship Service Authority.

According to the Henley Visa Index August 2019 Report, Papua New Guinea citizens can travel to 82 countries with or without a visa at the border. In this way, Papuan citizens are ranked 64th in terms of freedom of travel in the world.

Physical appearance 

Papua New Guinea passport cover in blue. The country's coat of arms is in the middle of the cover. Under the coat of arms are the name of the country (Papua New Guinea) and the name of the document (PASSPORT). The passport is 48 pages long and is written in English.

Identification page 

 Passport holder photo (Width: 35 mm, Height: 45 mm; Head height (up to the top of the hair): 34.5 mm; Distance from the top of the photo to the top of the hair: 3 mm)
 Type ("P" for passport)
 Code of the country
 Serial number of the passport
 Surname and first name of the passport holder
 Citizenship
 Date of birth (DD.MM.YYYY)
 Gender (M for men or F for women)
 Place of Birth
 Date of issue (DD.MM.YYYY)
 Passport holder's signature
 Expiry date (DD.MM.YYYY)

See also
Visa requirements for Papua New Guinean citizens
Visa policy of Papua New Guinea

References 

Papua New Guinea
Government of Papua New Guinea